IFK Göteborg finished inside the top three, but was nowhere near defending their title from 2007. As a consolation, IFK was able to win the cup final against Kalmar FF on penalties. The Champions League qualification ended with a 4–2 defeat away from home at FC Basel.

Players

Squad 
As of 21 September 2008:

Squad stats

Club

Coaching staff

Kit

|
|

Other information

Competitions

Overall

Allsvenskan

Results summary

Results by round

Competitive

Friendlies

Sources
  IFK Göteborg - Results & Fixtures at Soccerway

IFK Goteborg
IFK Göteborg seasons